The 2022 World Seniors Championship (officially the 2022 Ways Facilities Management World Seniors Snooker Championship) was a snooker tournament that took place from 4 to 8 May 2022 at the Crucible Theatre in Sheffield, England. The event was the 13th edition of the World Seniors Championship, first held in 1991, and was organised by the World Seniors Tour, which is open to players over 40 who are not in the top 64 of the world rankings. Qualifying rounds were held from 14 to 19 December 2021 and 8 to 13 February 2022 at the Crucible Sports and Social Club in Reading. Players who had qualified for that season's cancelled Seniors Masters and Seniors Irish Masters events — Patrick Wallace, Michael Judge, Wayne Cooper, Gary Filtness, Darren Morgan, Bob Chaperon and Rory McLeod — were invited to compete at the World Seniors Championship instead. Referees for the event were Michaela Tabb, Leo Scullion, Roy Gannon and Andy Yates. 

Dominic Dale was scheduled to participate, but re-entered the top 64 in the world rankings after the 2022 World Snooker Championship qualifiers, rendering him ineligible to compete. Michael Holt took Dale's place as the highest ranked eligible player. Maria Catalano, who had turned 40 in February, became the first woman to reach the final stages of a seniors event. She lost 0–3 to Wael Talaat in the last 24. Stephen Hendry played competitively for the first time since his first-round defeat at the 2021 UK Championship, but lost 0–3 to Lee Walker in the last 16. After losing 0–3 to Nigel Bond in the last 16, John Parrott announced his retirement from the seniors tour. He received a standing ovation in the Crucible as he displayed the World Snooker Championship trophy, which he won in 1991.

David Lilley was the defending champion, having defeated Jimmy White 5–3 in the 2021 final, but he lost 3–4 to Walker in the semi-finals, despite winning the first three frames. White reached a fourth consecutive final, making a 138 break in his 4–1 quarter-final win over McLeod and a 132 in his 4–0 semi-final win over Peter Lines. He led 3–1 and 4–2 in the final, but Walker won the last three frames to clinch a 5–4 victory and win his first seniors title. Calling the win a "career highlight", Walker said it was a "dream come true" to win a title at the Crucible.

Main draw

Final

Century breaks
Total: 3

138, 132  Jimmy White
121  Lee Walker

References 

2022 in English sport
2022 in snooker
World Seniors Championship
Sports competitions in Sheffield
2022
World Seniors Tour